Detrick DeBurr (born October 25, 1969) is an entrepreneur, author, and computer/website specialist. He rose to prominence with Deal Us In! How Black America Can Play and Win in the Digital Economy and Build Gamified Websites with PHP and JQuery. He is a co-founder of Game Time Giving. Prior to this, he was Founder/CEO of Digital Rhythm Inc., an IT service provider based in Dallas, Texas, USA.

Early life and education
DeBurr was born and raised in Monroe, Louisiana. He graduated from Neville High School in 1987 then later attended Southern University in Baton Rouge, Louisiana. He received a computer information systems degree from DeVry University after moving to Dallas, where he now resides.

Career
In February 2000, DeBurr left an up-and-coming corporate CAREER with GTE Directories (Verizon Information Services) to start Digital Rhythm Inc. Digital Rhythm is a Dallas, Texas based Information Technology services provider. Digital Rhythm specializes in providing sub-contract Information Technology services to prime Information Technology contractors.

DeBurr has published two books, "Build Gamified Websites with PHP and JQuery" (Packt Publishing) in September 2013 and "Deal Us In! How Black America can Play and Win in the Digital Economy" (Anji Publishing Inc.), in October 2002. In 2001, DeBurr received Stanford University's Digital Visions Fellowship for his efforts on projects addressing the "Digital Divide" all over world with extended work done in Ghana, West Africa. He has been a frequent lecturer on technology related issues all around the world. He is the former host of "CyWord" an online radio technology program aired by The Black World Today. In 2011 he founded CUPID! On The Go, a mobile application where users can get access to local news.

DeBurr serves on numerous boards and committees in his community, and ran for The Colony, TX City Council in 2021.

Personal life
DeBurr has three children: Terry, Joshua, and Aisha. He is an active member of Omega Psi Phi fraternity.

References

External links
 

1969 births
Living people
People from Monroe, Louisiana
Writers from Louisiana
Southern University alumni